Miroshniki is a rural locality (a selo) and the administrative center of Miroshnikovskoye Rural Settlement, Kotovsky District, Volgograd Oblast, Russia. The population was 402 as of 2010. There are 8 streets.

Geography
Miroshniki is located 40 km northwest of Kotovo (the district's administrative centre) by road. Burluk is the nearest rural locality.

References 

Rural localities in Kotovsky District